Jacob "Jake" Leeker (born June 14, 1995) is an American soccer player who plays as a goalkeeper.

Career

College and amateur
Leeker played college soccer at the University of Memphis between 2014 and 2017, including a redshirted year in 2013. Leeker totaled 10 shutouts in his 47 appearances for the Tigers to earn a save percentage of .749 in four years as a starter.

While at college, Leeker appeared for Premier Development League sides Mississippi Brilla and Des Moines Menace.

Professional
On January 29, 2018, Leeker signed with United Soccer League side Real Monarchs.

On January 30, 2019, Leeker joined USL Championship side Portland Timbers 2. Timbers 2 opted to stop operating following the 2020 season.

On March 12, 2021, Pittsburgh Riverhounds SC signed Leeker for the 2021 season with an option for 2022.

References

External links
 Memphis Tigers profile
 Real Monarchs profile

1995 births
Living people
American soccer players
Association football goalkeepers
Des Moines Menace players
Memphis Tigers men's soccer players
Mississippi Brilla players
Real Monarchs players
Real Salt Lake players
Pittsburgh Riverhounds SC players
Portland Timbers 2 players
Soccer players from St. Louis
USL Championship players
USL League Two players